Guan Xueting (born December 4, 1992 in Shenyang, Liaoning) is a Chinese ice dancer. With partner Wang Meng, she is the 2008 Chinese silver medalist. They placed 19th at the 2008 World Junior Championships. She previously competed with Zhang Yu.

Guan was abducted in June 2011 but was later released and returned home.

Competitive highlights
(with Wang)

References

External links
 Tracings.net profile

1992 births
Living people
Chinese female ice dancers
Sportspeople from Shenyang
Figure skaters from Liaoning
Competitors at the 2011 Winter Universiade